Halls is a town in Lauderdale County, Tennessee. The population was 2,255 at the 2010 census.

The town was founded in 1882 as a railroad station stop. It is named after Hansford R. Hall, one of the founders. Among the early business ventures were sawmills and cotton gins, founded in the 1880s to process local lumber and cotton.

Halls is home to the Veterans' Museum on the grounds of the Dyersburg Army Air Base, which documents the history of the World War II Army Air Corps. It was the main base for the B-17 Flying Fortress bombers in the mid-1940s.

History
The town was not established until 1882, when the Newport News & Mississippi Valley Railroad line (later the Illinois Central Railroad) set up a railroad stop here. The village was originally named Hall's Station in honor of Hansford R. Hall, one of the founders. Other founders were J. S. Stephens and S. A. Jordan, early businessmen of Lauderdale County.

E. Stanfield, general merchant, was first to set up a business at Hall's Station in 1882. Other early businesses included Young & Sawyer, a steam-powered cotton gin; D. P. Shoffner, steam sawmill and wagon material; J. H. Farmer, saw-, grist- and planing-mill and cotton gin. As of 1887 there were about 400 people in the community.

In 1999 a tornado struck Halls damaging a restaurant and The Halls First United Methodist Church.  The church has since been rebuilt in another location.

Geography

Halls is situated on the southeastern edge of the New Madrid Seismic Zone, an area with a high earthquake risk.

Demographics

2020 census

As of the 2020 United States census, there were 2,091 people, 887 households, and 557 families residing in the town.

2000 census
As of the census of 2000, there were 2,311 people, 946 households, and 642 families residing in the town. The population density was 630.8 people per square mile (243.8/km2). There were 1,051 housing units at an average density of 286.9 per square mile (110.9/km2). The racial makeup of the town was 70.45% White, 28.13% African American, 0.48% Native American, 0.09% Asian, 0.04% Pacific Islander, 0.17% from other races, and 0.65% from two or more races. Hispanic or Latino of any race were 0.65% of the population.

There were 946 households, out of which 29.7% had children under the age of 18 living with them, 45.3% were married couples living together, 17.7% had a female householder with no husband present, and 32.1% were non-families. 30.0% of all households were made up of individuals, and 15.9% had someone living alone who was 65 years of age or older. The average household size was 2.44 and the average family size was 3.03.

In the town, the population was spread out, with 26.7% under the age of 18, 7.7% from 18 to 24, 26.8% from 25 to 44, 22.3% from 45 to 64, and 16.4% who were 65 years of age or older. The median age was 37 years. For every 100 females, there were 87.1 males. For every 100 females age 18 and over, there were 81.8 males.

The median income for a household in the town was $24,142, and the median income for a family was $29,063. Males had a median income of $26,528 versus $19,300 for females. The per capita income for the town was $15,011. About 21.8% of families and 23.3% of the population were below the poverty line, including 29.2% of those under age 18 and 29.0% of those age 65 or over.

Veterans' Museum

The Veterans' Museum on the grounds of the former Dyersburg Army Air Base is dedicated to the preservation and documentation of materials related to military activities from World War I to the Iraq War, as well as documenting the history of the air base itself.

References

External links
Town of Halls, Tennessee website

Towns in Lauderdale County, Tennessee
Towns in Tennessee